Yukpa (Yuco, Yucpa, Yuko, Yupa) is a Cariban language, spoken by 3,000 people in Zulia State in Venezuela and 3,000 across the border in Colombia. It's also known as Carib Motilón, Macoíta, Northern Motilón, Manso.

Río Casacará (Iroka) and Río Maracas are the main dialects, and different enough to maybe be considered separate languages. Also Caño Padilla–La Laguna. The Venezuelan dialects, Yrapa and Río Negro, are closer to Río Maracas than to Río Casacará. 

Similarity to Japrería, the other Yupka language, is slight.

References

External links
 

Indigenous languages of the South American Northwest
Cariban languages
Languages of Venezuela
Languages of Colombia